Caloptilia striata is a moth of the family Gracillariidae. It is known from Jiangxi, China.

References

striata
Moths of Asia
Moths described in 1990